is the eighth studio album by Chara, which was released on July 18, 2001. It debuted at #8 on the Japanese Oricon album charts, and charted in the top 300 for 8 weeks.

While Chara wrote the song entirely herself, the arrangement was split between six people: Chara, rock musician Yasuyuki Okamura, Shinichi Igarashi (who formerly collaborated on Duca with Chara, two members of the band Great3 (Kiyoshi Takakuwa, Ken'ichi Shirane) and the guitarist for Kiyoshi Takakuwa's solo project, Curly Giraffe, Yukio Nagoshi. It reached #32, and sold over 25,000 copies.

Skirt was released a few weeks before the album's release, and was used in a Pocari Sweat commercial. It was a collaboration between Chara and former Smashing Pumpkins guitarist James Iha. Iha also worked with Chara on an album track, Boku ni Utsushite, which was later released as a recut single in October.

The album track  was used as the second ending theme for the anime series PaRappa the Rapper.

Artist Ed Tsuwaki created the cover and booklet for Madrigal, along with the singles Skirt and Boku ni Utsushite.

Track listing

Singles

Japan sales rankings

Various charts

References
 	

Chara (singer) albums
2001 albums